Green Square may refer to:
 Green Square, New South Wales, in Sydney, Australia
 Martyrs' Square, Tripoli, in Libya, formerly known as Green Square
 Green Square, the main protagonist of the Green Square franchise.
 Green Square, Mingora, in Swat District, Pakistan

See also

Greene Square (Savannah, Georgia)